The 1998 Adur District Council election took place on 7 May 1998 to elect members of Adur District Council in West Sussex, England. One third of the council was up for election and the Liberal Democrats stayed in overall control of the council.

After the election, the composition of the council was:
Liberal Democrat 22
Labour 10
Conservative 5
Independent 2

Results

References

1998
1998 English local elections
1990s in West Sussex